Joseph Kilian is a 1963 short Czech drama film directed by Pavel Juráček and Jan Schmidt. It was released in 1964. The movie belongs to the Czech New Wave.

Plot
Jan Herold is trying to find comrade Kilian, but no one ever heard of him. He wanders the streets of Prague when he suddenly sees a "Cat rental company". He decides to rent a cat and goes home. When he comes back the next day to return the cat, the company is gone and there's no evidence it ever existed. He then continues to search for the mysterious Killian. When he finally finds his office, it is empty. He goes to a pub and sees a man who looks a lot like Killian, but when he asks him, the man denies it and leaves in a hurry. Before losing him Jan can see the man is carrying a cat.

Cast
 Karel Vašíček as Jan Herold
 Consuela Morávková as Saleswoman
 Ivan Růžička as Official
 Pavel Bártl as Kilian
 Jiří Stivín as Musician
 Pavel Šilhánek as Man with cresset

Reception
The film was well-received by international film critics. Many reviewers favourably compared the film to Kafka's work. Czechoslovak communist critics attacked the film on ideological basis.

Release
The film premiered on 4 September 1964 in Czechoslovakia. First DVD release was by Second Run in 2013 on a disc with František Vláčil's The White Dove.
The film was digitally restored in 4K by Czech Film Archive and re-released in cinemas on 3 March 2016. The restored version was released together with Case for a Rookie Hangman on DVD and Blu-ray on 26 April 2017.

Awards
Grand Prix at 1964 International Short Film Festival Oberhausen
FIPRESCI Prize at 1964 Mannheim International Film Festival

Bibliography

References

External links
 

1963 films
1963 drama films
1960s Czech-language films
Czech black-and-white films
Czech satirical films
Films with screenplays by Pavel Juráček
Czech drama films
Absurdist fiction
1960s Czech films